Killers of Kilimanjaro is a 1959 British CinemaScope adventure film directed by Richard Thorpe and starring Robert Taylor, Anthony Newley, Anne Aubrey and Donald Pleasence for Warwick Films.

The film was originally known as Adamson of Africa.

Main cast
 Robert Taylor as Robert Adamson
 Anthony Newley as Hooky Hook
 Anne Aubrey as Jane Carlton
 Donald Pleasence as Captain
 Grégoire Aslan as Ben Ahmed
 Allan Cuthbertson as Saxton 
 Martin Benson as Ali
 Orlando Martins as Chief
 John Dimech as Pasha
 Martin Boddey as Gunther

Production
Warwick Films had made three films in Africa, Safari, Zarak and Odongo. The movie was announced in July 1956 and inspired by the story of the Tsavo maneaters recounted in the 1954 book African Bush Adventures by J.A. Hunter and Daniel P. Mannix. It was based on a story by Richard Maibaum and Cyril Hume. (Warwick also announced they would make a second African film, the musical The Golden Fiddle, which would ultimately not be made.)

A screenplay was done by Peter Viertel, who had worked on The African Queen, and written a novel of the experiences called White Hunter, Black Heart. In September 1957 Alan Ladd, who had made three films for Warwick, was the announced as male lead – it was meant to be part of a six-picture deal between Ladd and Warwick worth $2 million that also included The Man Inside and It's Always Four O'Clock.

In the final event Ladd made no further films for Warwick - the lead role went to Robert Taylor. Taylor signed in January 1959 at which time the film was called African Bush. Co-stars Anthony Newley and Anne Aubrey were under contract to Warwick, and had just made Idol on Parade for the company.

In February 1959 Taylor left for Moshi, Tanganyika. That was the same location used for Mogambo and Tarzan's Greatest Adventure. Filming was completed by April.

Release
The film's title was changed to Killers of Kilimanjaro. This upset Chief Thomas Marealle of the Chagga tribe, on whose lands the film was shot, and he made an official complaint.

The Monthly Film Bulletin said "enthusiasts for screen slaughter should be amply entertained."

The New York Times called it "a compendium of jungle cliches".

According to Jeffrey Richards, movies such as Killers of Kilimanjaro pushed the narrative that the British were not in East Africa to further their own ends, but instead perpetuated the myth that they were there to protect the natives from the evil Arab slavers.

See also
 Men Against the Sun (1952)

References

External links

Killers of Kilimanjaro at Colonial Film

1959 films
1959 adventure films
British adventure films
Columbia Pictures films
CinemaScope films
1950s English-language films
Films based on non-fiction books
Films directed by Richard Thorpe
Films set in Kenya
Films set in Tanzania
Films set in the 1890s
Films shot in Kenya
Films about lions
Films scored by William Alwyn
Films with screenplays by Richard Maibaum
1950s British films